David Bates (born ) is a former professional rugby league footballer who played in the 2000s.

International honours
David Bates won 3 caps for Ireland in 2003–2006 while at Gateshead Thunder, Halifax and York + 3-caps (interchange/substitute).

References

External links
(archived by web.archive.org) Statistics at thecastlefordtigers.co.uk
Statistics at wolvesplayers.thisiswarrington.co.uk

1980 births
Living people
Castleford Tigers players
Dewsbury Rams players
English people of Irish descent
English rugby league players
Halifax R.L.F.C. players
Hunslet R.L.F.C. players
Ireland national rugby league team players
Newcastle Thunder players
Place of birth missing (living people)
Rugby league props
Warrington Wolves players
York City Knights players